The Kawdy Plateau is a plateau in northern British Columbia, Canada, located between the Nahlin and Tuya Rivers. It includes the granitic Atsutla Range and Nazcha Hills and the volcanic Kawdy Mountain.

See also
List of plateaus in British Columbia

References

Kawdy Plateau in the Canadian Mountain Encyclopedia.

Stikine Plateau
Cassiar Country